People's Square is a common name used to refer to the main public square in a number of cities in People's Republic of China.

People's Square may also refer to:

 People's Square Station, Shanghai
 People's Square (Ürümqi), Ürümqi, Xinjiang, China
 People's Square (Dalian), Dalian, Liaoning, China
 People's Square and Park, Yangon, Burma

See also
 People's Park (disambiguation)
 People Square Station, Hangzhou
 Piazza del Popolo, Rome
 Piazza del Popolo, Cesena